Napoleone Comitoli (1548 – 30 August 1624) was a Roman Catholic prelate who served as Bishop of Perugia (1591–1624).

Biography
Napoleone Comitoli was born in Castelleone (Deruta), Italy in 1548. On 19 Jul 1591, he was appointed during the papacy of Pope Gregory XIV as Bishop of Perugia.
On 11 Aug 1591, he was consecrated bishop by Giulio Antonio Santorio, Cardinal-Priest of San Bartolomeo all'Isola, with Ludovico de Torres, Archbishop of Monreale, Flaminio Filonardi, Bishop of Aquino, and Leonard Abel, Titular Bishop of Sidon, serving as co-consecrators. He served as Bishop of Perugia until his death on 30 Aug 1624.

While bishop, he was the principal co-consecrator of Fabio Aresti, Bishop of Lucera (1601); Innocenzo Del Bufalo-Cancellieri, Bishop of Camerino (1601); and Virgilio Fiorenzi, Bishop of Nocera Umbra (1605).

See also
Catholic Church in Italy

References

External links and additional sources
 (for Chronology of Bishops) 
 (for Chronology of Bishops) 

1548 births
1624 deaths
People from Deruta
17th-century Italian Roman Catholic bishops
Bishops appointed by Pope Gregory XIV